New Bern Battlefield Site is a historic site of the American Civil War Battle of New Bern located near New Bern, Craven County, North Carolina.  The battle was fought on 14 March 1862. The New Bern Battlefield Site consists of two discontiguous sites.

The Site was listed on the National Register of Historic Places in 2001.

The New Bern Historical Society owns about 27 acres of the battlefield site and protects it as New Bern Battlefield Park, which includes a visitor center and monument.  The Society offers guided tours of the park by appointment.  Self-guided brochures are available from the Society's website. The Civil War Trust (a division of the American Battlefield Trust) and its partners have acquired and preserved  of the battlefield.

References

External links
 New Bern Battlefield Park - New Bern Historical Society
 Video showing various locations at the site from 2016

American Civil War battlefields
North Carolina in the American Civil War
Protected areas of Craven County, North Carolina
National Register of Historic Places in Craven County, North Carolina
Parks in North Carolina
New Bern, North Carolina
Conflict sites on the National Register of Historic Places in North Carolina
American Civil War on the National Register of Historic Places